is a district located in Ōita Prefecture, Japan.

As of April 2006, the district has an estimated population of 2,898. The total area is now down to 6.75 km2.

There is only one village left in the district.
Himeshima

Until March 30, 2006, the district additionally had four towns.
Aki
Kunimi
Kunisaki
Musashi

District Timeline
On March 31, 2006 the old town of Kunisaki absorbed the towns of Aki, Kunimi and Musashi to become the new city of Kunisaki.

Districts in Ōita Prefecture